Bagwis is a fictional Filipino comics character created by Elwood Perez as comic series in Tempo, a daily tabloid published by Manila Bulletin Publishing Corporation. The comic ended in 1992. Bagwis is a warrior angel modeled after the Archangel Michael and has superhuman strength. He fights evil with a sword and shield that came from the heavens. His name comes from the Tagalog word "Bagwis" which means "wing".

In 1989, the comic serial was adapted for the film Bagwis with Chuck Perez portraying the title character.

Other uses
An unrelated fictional character also called Bagwis appears in the telefantasya Mulawin broadcast by GMA Network, and also in its spin-off, Encantadia. The character was portrayed by Zoren Legaspi.

References

Filipino comics characters
Fictional Filipino people
Filipino superheroes
Male characters in comics
Fictional swordfighters in comics
Fictional characters with superhuman strength
Fictional angels
Superhero film characters
Philippine comics adapted into films